Elections for New York City's borough presidents were held on November 2, 1897. The City of Greater New York, as the newly enlarged New York City was colloquially known, had been created from what had been New York City, Richmond County, Kings County (then coterminous with the City of Brooklyn), and the western part of Queens County. The city was then divided into five boroughs, which each elected a borough president every four years.

Democrats won the presidencies of all five boroughs, as well as the mayoralty, Comptroller, and Council President of the new city.

References

New York City borough president
Borough President 1897
Election 1897
New York City borough president
Borough president elections
New York City borough president elections